Twin Bridges Airport may refer to:

 Twin Bridges Airport (Idaho) in Ketchum, Idaho, United States (FAA: U61)
 Twin Bridges Airport (Montana) in Twin Bridges, Montana, United States (FAA: 7S1)